The Bachelor of Science in Sustainable Management is an online interdisciplinary sustainable management bachelor's degree program. A joint effort between the University of Wisconsin–Extension and four of the University of Wisconsin campuses, UW–Parkside, UW–River Falls, UW–Stout, and UW–Superior, the program began enrolling students for the fall 2009 semester.

About
The Bachelor of Science in Sustainable Management is a fully accredited bachelor's degree completion program. The program was approved by the University of  Wisconsin Board of Regents, and is accredited by the North Central Association of Colleges and Schools.
The curriculum was developed in cooperation with companies that are leading the way in sustainability, including Johnson Controls, Ford Motor Company, Eastman Kodak, Quad Graphics, FedEx, SC Johnson, Kohl's Department Stores, Veolia Environmental Services, and Modine Manufacturing. UW–Extension also worked with the Wisconsin Department of Natural Resources and other government agencies, along with faculty from the four UW campuses, to build the curriculum.

Competencies
The program's goal is for students to gain an understanding of how business systems, natural systems, and social systems intersect. In addition, students will learn how to preserve natural resources and strengthen communities while helping businesses develop sustainable practices in a global marketplace.

The competencies for the Bachelor of Science in Sustainable Management degree were developed with help from corporate leaders interested in sustainability and the triple bottom line. To meet all intended learning outcomes of the program, students must demonstrate the following:

Technical Competencies
Carbon trading and carbon credits
Climate change and global warming implications on businesses and societies
Water policy and water science
Logistics and transportation of raw materials
Supply chain
The mechanics of energy generation, energy infrastructure, energy management, energy policy, and energy purchasing
Sustainable marketing, communications, and public affairs with a focus on triple bottom line practices

General Competencies
World geography
Cultural understanding
Political awareness
Geopolitical dynamics
Global gender issues
Opportunity analysis

Certificates
The program also offers two certificates. The 15-credit Sustainable Enterprise Management certificate is available through UW–Parkside, UW–Stout, and UW–Superior. The 12-credit Sustainable Management Science certificate is available through UW–Parkside, UW–River Falls, UW–Stout, and UW–Superior.

External links
University of Wisconsin Sustainable Management
University of Wisconsin–Parkside
University of Wisconsin–River Falls
University of Wisconsin–Stout
University of Wisconsin–Superior

References

University of Wisconsin System